Boluk-bashi was an Ottoman officer rank equivalent to captain (see Military of the Ottoman Empire). The holder was in command of a bölük, a sub-division of a regiment. It was higher than oda-bashi (lieutenant).


Serbian hajduks
 
It was adopted by the Serbian hajduks and into the Serbian Revolutionary Army as buljubaša or buljukbaša.

People such as Janko Gagić, Arsenije Loma, Konda Bimbaša, Zeka Buljubaša, Veljko Petrović and Petar Dobrnjac had the rank of  buljubaša in the prelude and during the Serbian Revolution.

Notable people

Rıza Tevfik Bölükbaşı, Turkish philosopher
Zerrin Bölükbaşı, Turkish sculptor
Iliaș Colceag ( 1710–1743), Moldavian
Abdul Bölükbaşı ( 1821), Tripolitsa
Yahya bey Dukagjini (1498–1582), Albanian

See also
Bölükbaşı (surname)
Buljubašić

References

Military ranks of the Ottoman Empire
Turkish words and phrases